Duesler is an unincorporated community in Blackhoof Township, Carlton County, Minnesota, United States.

Carlton County Road 6 serves as a main route in the community. Duesler is located eight miles east of Barnum.

Further reading
 Mn/DOT map of Carlton County – 2012 edition

Unincorporated communities in Carlton County, Minnesota
Unincorporated communities in Minnesota